Boris Bursać (born 1989) is a politician in Serbia. He has served in the National Assembly of Serbia since October 2020 as a member of the Serbian Progressive Party.

Private career
Bursać lives in Belgrade and is a master manager by educational training. He has published articles on the subject of terrorism.

Politician
Bursać is chair of the youth council of the Progressive Party's municipal board in Zemun. He was awarded the 195th position on the party's Aleksandar Vučić — For Our Children electoral list for the 2020 Serbian parliamentary election and narrowly missed direct election when the list won a landslide majority with 188 of 250 mandates. He received a mandate on 28 October 2020 as the replacement for another party member. Bursać is the leader of Serbia's parliamentary friendship group with Mozambique and a member of the friendship groups with Armenia, Israel, Montenegro, Russia, the United Kingdom, and the United States of America.

References

1989 births
Living people
Politicians from Belgrade
Members of the National Assembly (Serbia)
Serbian Progressive Party politicians